Edward J. Hirshberg (December 27, 1908 – December 27, 1983) was an American football player and coach. He played college football at the University of Pittsburgh as an end and was team captain in 1931. Hirshberg served as the head football coach at the Carnegie Institute of Technology—now known as Carnegie Mellon University—in Pittsburgh, Pennsylvania from 1960 to 1962, compiling a record of 5–19. He also coached as an assistant at his alma mater, Pittsburgh, as well as St. Thomas College—now known as the University of Scranton, Dartmouth College, West Virginia University, and Yale University.

Hirshberg was born in Louisville, Kentucky. During World War II he served in the Pacific as a colonel in the United States Marine Corps. Hirschberg later owned and operated WEDO, a radio station in McKeesport, Pennsylvania. He was also a housing developer, owner of the Boldoc Country Club in Huntingdon, Pennsylvania, and had an association with the Family Furniture Store in McKeesport. Hirshberg died on December 27, 1983, in North Miami Beach, Florida.

Head coaching record

References

External links
 

1908 births
1983 deaths
American football ends
American radio executives
Carnegie Mellon Tartans football coaches
Dartmouth Big Green football coaches
Pittsburgh Panthers football players
Scranton Royals football coaches
West Virginia Mountaineers football coaches
Yale Bulldogs football coaches
United States Marine Corps personnel of World War II
United States Marine Corps officers
Players of American football from Louisville, Kentucky
Sportspeople from Louisville, Kentucky